St Michael and All Angels’ Church, Littlethorpe is a Grade II listed parish church in the Church of England in Littlethorpe, North Yorkshire England.

History

The site for the church was given by Mr Denison of Scarborough. It was built to designs of the architect Robert Hargreave Brodrick. The church comprises a nave, chancel, apsidal vestry, organ chamber, south porch and bell cote. It was built in brick with stone dressings, moulded red and blue Staffordshire bricks being used for window jambs and string courses. It was roofed with Staffordshire flat tiles. The floor was laid with Maw's encaustic tiles, and the church was lit with a brass gas corona. Warming stoves by Musgrave and Co of Belfast were installed. The church was consecrated on 23 April 1878 by the Bishop of Ripon.

References

Church of England church buildings in North Yorkshire
Grade II listed churches in North Yorkshire